Ushcaloy (Ç̇innax, Üş-Qelli) is a village in the Itum-Kalinsky District of the Chechen Republic. It is the administrative center of the Ushkaloiskiy rural settlement.

Geography 

The village is located on both banks of the Argun River, at the confluence of the left tributary Dzumserk (Дзумсэрк), 5 km north-east of the regional center Itum-Kali.

The nearest settlements are: in the north, the village of Guchum-Kale (Гучум-Кале); in the southeast, the village of Bugaroy (Бугарой); in the southwest, the village of Konzhukhoi (Конжухой); and in the northwest, the village of Gukhoi (Гухой).

History 

Ushcaloy is the ancestral village of teip Chinkhoy.

Population 
The population of Ushcaloy was 304 in 1990, and rose to 535 in 2020.

Infrastructure 

Ushcaloy is home to a rural mosque and Ushkaloiskaya municipal secondary school.

References 

Rural localities in Itum-Kalinsky District